Hortalotarsus (etymology uncertain; probably "tarsus of a young bird"?) is a dubious genus of extinct sauropodomorph from Early Jurassic rocks of South Africa.

Discovery and naming
The type species, Hortalotarsus skirtopodus was named by Harry Seeley in 1894, initially as a species of Thecodontosaurus. According to Robert Broom (1911), "Originally most of the skeleton was in the rock, and it was regarded by the farmers as the skeleton of a Bushman, but it is said to have been destroyed through fear that a Bushman skeleton in the rock might tend to weaken the religious belief of the rising generation." Seeley however, states that most of the skeleton was lost by a failed attempt to free it from the rock by using gunpowder. Some partial leg bones were salvaged.

Hortalotarsus was subsequently regarded as either a synonym of Massospondylus or a valid genus belonging to Anchisauridae. Galton and Cluver (1976) as well as Galton and Upchurch (2004), however, designated this genus a nomen dubium.

References

Massospondylidae
Nomina dubia
Fossil taxa described in 1894